Tylomelania patriarchalis is a species of freshwater snail with an operculum, an aquatic gastropod mollusk in the family Pachychilidae.

Distribution 
This species occurs in Malili lakes, Sulawesi, Indonesia. It occur in the single lake and the type locality is the lake Matano.

Description 
The shell has 6-9 whorls.

The width of the shell is 26 mm. The height of the shell is 82 mm. The width of the aperture is 14 mm. The height of the aperture is 22 mm.

There are 6-7 concentric lines on the operculum.

References

External links 
 von Rintelen T. & Glaubrecht M. (2005). "Anatomy of an adaptive radiation: a unique reproductive strategy in the endemic freshwater gastropod Tylomelania (Cerithioidea: Pachychilidae) on Sulawesi, Indonesia and its biogeographical implications." Biological Journal of the Linnean Society 85: 513–542. .

patriarchalis
Gastropods described in 1897